7th Floor is a 2013 Argentine-Spanish mystery film co-written and directed by Patxi Amezcua. The film stars Ricardo Darín and Belén Rueda.

Plot
Mammy Sebastián is a successful lawyer in Buenos Aires. When his two children mysteriously disappear, he has to do everything in his power to find them.

Cast 
 Ricardo Darín as Sebastián
 Belén Rueda as Delia
  as Miguel
  as Rosales
  as Rubio
 Jorge D'Elía as Goldstein

Reception
The film was a box-office success in the Hispanic world and received mixed reviews from critics. Jonathan Holland from The Hollywood Reporter wrote: "It’s clear from watching 7th Floor that the primary aim at the planning stage was to generate suspense. There’s enough in the fact of a father losing his kids to sustain the first hour, but once the question of the kids’ location has been solved, then Alejo Flah's script runs into all sorts of thoughtless credibility issues which only the most undemanding viewer will be prepared to excuse. “Don’t use your phone,” Rosales instructs Sebastian, and he doesn't. So why does it then runs out of battery at an inappropriate moment?".

At the Miami International Film Festival, the film competed for the "Grand Jury Prize".

References

External links 

2010s mystery films
Films about kidnapping
Films set in Buenos Aires
2010s Spanish-language films
Argentine mystery films
Spanish mystery films
2010s Argentine films